Santa Ana Winds FC, also known as Winds FC, is a soccer team founded in Santa Ana, California, and a founding United Premier Soccer League club currently playing at the Lake Forest Sports Park, with occasional matches played at Championship Stadium at the Orange County Great Park. The club takes its name from a Southern California weather condition known as the Santa Ana winds. Santa Ana Winds FC, an elite amateur and professional development club, has played international development squads in the past, namely matches against a Club Atlas U-20 squad in March 2011, and a Chivas de Guadalajara U-20 squad in November 2011. On November 18, 2017, the club made history by qualifying to the 2018 U.S. Open Cup for the first time. On Tuesday, June 5, 2018, Winds FC winger Juan Arellano became the first player to transfer directly from Santa Ana Winds FC to an international professional club.

Santa Ana Winds FC was founded in 2006 by Leonel López and brothers.

History

SoCal Premier
Santa Ana Winds FC played in the SoCal Premier League from 2006 to 2011 before joining the National Premier Soccer League West Region-Flight Southwest Conference, also in 2011. The club played in the 2006–07 Raúl Briones Cup, Group B, that they shared with Morelos, PSA and OC United. Winds FC finished third behind Morelos and PSA.

2006–07 Raúl Briones Cup, Group B

NPSL

Winds FC finished second in the NPSL Southwest Conference during their sole NPSL season, made the playoffs and fell in the first round to Hollywood United Hitmen, a national finalist that year, by a score of 3–1.

The club left the NPSL after one season due to a split between owners. One faction of ownership left and kept the Santa Ana Winds FC name, while forming a startup development league called the United Premier Soccer League, which was also founded in Santa Ana. The other faction of ownership continued to operate in the NPSL with the borrowed name Fullerton Rangers, and later called themselves Orange County Spartans, and then OC Pateadores, before disappearing from the NPSL. Winds FC shared the NPSL West – Flight Southwest conference with FC Hasental, Lancaster Rattlers (now FC Santa Clarita), San Diego Boca F.C. and the San Diego Flash.

2011 NPSL West Division – Flight Southwest, Final Standings

UPSL

Santa Ana Winds FC was a founding club of the United Premier Soccer League, established in 2011. The club has been playing UPSL, Open Cup and State Cup matches since in Lake Forest, California or Irvine, California consistently in the last few years, while attempting to find a home field in the City of Santa Ana. Winds FC has one UPSL Championship title, from the 2012–13 season, a league cup title (later named Admiral Cup) from 2014, two Western Conference, SoCal Division Championship titles and one Western Conference Championship title from the Spring-Summer 2018 season. The club played all of their Spring 2016 league matches at the Lake Forest Sports Complex in Lake Forest, approximately 17 miles away from the City of Santa Ana, and began scheduling UPSL summer/fall season matches at Santa Ana College in July 2016. Other fields where the club has played UPSL matches include the Orange County Great Park and Las Lomas Park, both in Irvine.

The club began playing UPSL matches at the SAUSD Sports Complex Stadium, also known as Valley Falcons Stadium, in April 2017. On December 7, 2017 Santa Ana Winds FC played their first UPSL league match at the newly built Championship Stadium at the Orange County Great Park against the LA Wolves, a game Winds FC won 3–1. Winds FC returned to Championship Stadium on January 7, 2018 in a playoff match against Orange County FC, a game Winds FC won 6–5 in penalty kicks. On January 13, Winds FC defeated the East Bay Stompers Juniors in the UPSL National Semi-final at Championship Stadium.

Juan Arellano Transfer to Cartaginés

On Tuesday, June 5, 2018, Club Sport Cartaginés of Costa Rica, coached by Paulo Wanchope announced new player signings ahead of their 2018 season among which Winds FC winger Juan Arellano was included. Juan Arellano became the first player to transfer directly from Santa Ana Winds FC to a professional club. Juan Arellano spent a week-long trial with the club prior to being invited to preseason and subsequently presented with C.S. Cartaginés.

Santa Ana Winds FC México

In 2017, a Mexican development club using the Santa Ana Winds FC name sprouted in Mexico City, in the Avante section of the Coyoacán borough. The team trained and played at the Jesús Clark Flores sporting park, between Santa Ana and Avenida Calzada de la Virgen streets. Winds FC founders Leonel López and Pedro Magallón granted use of the club name to Mexico-based trainer Roberto Vásquez.

Costa Rica and Central America

Winds FC named Costa Rican soccer personality José Luis Bustos Director of International Soccer Operations for Costa Rica and Central America in October 2018. Part of Bustos's tasks include forming a partnership with a professional Costa Rican club and organizing a tournament in Costa Rica where Winds FC along with Asociación Deportiva Carmelita are set to participate in.

Club Crest
The first Santa Ana Winds FC crest dates from 2006 to 2013 and features the Spurgeon Building's clock tower, located in the Downtown Santa Ana Historic District and named after city founder William H. Spurgeon.

The second Santa Ana Winds FC crest (2014–17) was redesigned in 2014 by sports logo artist Slavo Kiss for Sigma Kappa Brands, based in the Slovak Republic. The crest featured the City of Santa Ana water tower, visible from the Santa Ana Freeway, also known as the Interstate 5 Freeway or Golden State Freeway, which connects the cities of Los Angeles and San Diego, and connects at the Mexico–United States border to the city of Tijuana.

The third and most-current Santa Ana Winds FC crest was redesigned in late 2017 again by Slavo Kiss looking to 2018 and the club's debut in the U.S. Open Cup.

Rivalries
 The Golden City Classic (an all-Santa Ana rivalry versus La Máquina)
 The Sunset Derby (versus LA Wolves FC)
 The I-5 Derby (versus Orange County FC)

Supporter Groups

The Aeolian Guard 
The Angeltown Post
The I-Fivers

2018 Open Cup Squad
The following players were called to the September 23 Open Cup qualifying match versus Outbreak Soccer.

Player Number, Name, Position:

1. Adrian Urquizo, GK

2. Ezequiel Estrada

3. Juan Fuentes, RB

4. Oscar Sandoval

5. Israel Espinoza

8. Kyle O'Brien, MF

9. Carlos Andrade

13. Khalil Zaid

14. Quinn M. Harter, CB

16. Derek Solano

17. Juan Arellano, LW

19. Ruben Ortiz

20. Osvaldo Hernandez

21. Kramer Runager, F

23. George Zuniga

Jordan Gorman
Omar Perez

Front Office

  Leonel López: Founder, President
  Marco Paniagua: General Manager

Head coaches
  Marco Paniagua (2018–present)
  Jose Lopez (2016–2018)
  Arturo Martínez (2016)
  Cesar Reyes (2015–2016)
  Mele López (2013–2014)

Team records

2018 Spring UPSL Playoffs

Western Conference, SoCal Division Champion

Final Rounds

2017–18 Fall/Winter UPSL Playoffs

National Finalist, Runner-Up

2016–17 Fall/Winter UPSL Playoffs

Winds FC defeated regional powerhouse and conference rival La Máquina FC on Tuesday, January 24, 2017 at Santa Ana Stadium by a score of 2–1.

U.S. Open Cup record

2018 Open Cup

2018 Open Cup Qualifying

2017 Open Cup Qualifying

Santa Ana Winds FC were scheduled to host fellow UPSL club La Habra City FC at Lake Forest Sports Park on Sunday, September 18 in a qualifying match to the first round of the 2017 U.S. Open Cup, but had the match moved to Colton High School in Colton, California. Santa Ana defeated La Habra City FC by a score of 5–0 in the first-ever U.S. Open Cup qualifying match for either team.

The October 23 Open Cup qualifier vs La Máquina was cancelled due to a thunderstorm in Irvine, and was rescheduled for October 30 at 6 pm at Orange County Great Park.

Honors

Titles
UPSL National Championship: Runner-Up, 2019–20
UPSL Western Conference Champion, Fall-Winter 2019-20
UPSL Western Conference, SoCal Division Champion, Fall-Winter 2019-20
UPSL Western Conference Champion, Spring 2018
UPSL Western Conference, SoCal Division Champion, Spring 2018
UPSL Western Conference, SoCal Division Champion, Fall-Winter, 2017–18
UPSL National Championship: Runner-Up, Fall-Winter 2017–18
UPSL, Admiral Cup Champions: 2014
United Premier Soccer League Champions: Fall-Winter 2012–13

Individual Honors
National United Premier Soccer League Most Valuable Player: Kyle O'Brien, Fall 2017
National Player of the Week: Jordan Gorman, 2017, Western Pro Premier Division, Week 17
National Player of the Week: Adan Coronado, 2017, Western Pro Premier Division, Week 3

Tournament Finishing

U.S. Open Cup: Qualified, First Round, 2018
UPSL Fall-Winter National Championship: Runner-Up, 2017–18
Cal South State Cup, Quarterfinals, 2018
Cal South State Cup, Quarterfinals, 2017
US Open Cup, Second Qualifying Round, 2016

Home fields (All time: SoCal Premier, NPSL, UPSL)
 Heritage Park Field; Irvine, California (2006–2008)
 Rancho Capistrano; San Juan Capistrano, California (2006–2008)
 Centennial Park Field; Santa Ana, California (2009–2010)
 Oak Creek Park Field; Irvine, California (2009–2010)
 Westgrove Park; Garden Grove, California (2009–2010)
 Santa Ana Stadium; Santa Ana, California (2011–2013)
 Santa Ana College; Santa Ana, California (2013)
 Orange County Great Park; Irvine, California (2013–2016)
 Las Lomas Community Park; Irvine, California (2014)
 Lake Forest Sports Park; Lake Forest, California (2016–2017)
 Championship Stadium at OC Great Park; Irvine, California (Dec. 2017)

Sponsors and partners
Score Sports, 2018–21
Admiral Sportswear, 2014–18
Molten, 2014–18

Season-by-season

References

External links
 

 
Soccer in Los Angeles
United Premier Soccer League teams
Association football clubs established in 2006
2006 establishments in California
Sports in Los Angeles
Soccer clubs in Greater Los Angeles
Soccer clubs in California